41st BSFC Awards
December 13, 2020

Best Film: 
Nomadland

The 41st Boston Society of Film Critics Awards, honoring the best in filmmaking in 2020, were given on December 13, 2020.

Winners

 Best Film:
 Nomadland
 Runner-up: First Cow
 Best Director:
 Chloé Zhao – Nomadland
 Runner-up: Kelly Reichardt – First Cow
 Best Actor:
 Anthony Hopkins – The Father
 Runner-up: Riz Ahmed – Sound of Metal
 Best Actress:
 Sidney Flanigan – Never Rarely Sometimes Always
 Runner-up: Julia Garner – The Assistant
 Best Supporting Actor:
 Paul Raci – Sound of Metal
 Runner-up: Brian Dennehy – Driveways (posthumous)
 Best Supporting Actress:
 Youn Yuh-jung – Minari
 Runner-up: Amanda Seyfried – Mank
 Best Screenplay:
 Charlie Kaufman – I'm Thinking of Ending Things
 Runner-up: Jonathan Raymond and Kelly Reichardt – First Cow
 Best Animated Film:
 The Wolf House
 Runner-up: Wolfwalkers
 Best Documentary:
 Collective
 Runner-up: The Painter and the Thief
 Best Non-English Language Film:
 La Llorona
 Runner-up: The Painted Bird
 Best Cinematography:
 Joshua James Richards – Nomadland
 Runner-up: Shabier Kirchner – Lovers Rock
 Best Film Editing:
 Robert Frazen – I'm Thinking of Ending Things
 Runner-up: Chloé Zhao – Nomadland
 Best Original Score:
 Emile Mosseri – Minari
 Runner-up: Trent Reznor and Atticus Ross – Mank
 Best New Filmmaker:
 Florian Zeller – The Father
 Runner-up: Autumn de Wilde – Emma
 Best Ensemble Cast:
 Ma Rainey's Black Bottom
 Runner-up: Minari

References

External links
 Official website

2020
2020 film awards
2020 awards in the United States
2020 in Boston
December 2020 events in the United States